is a Japanese consumer electronics  company, specializing in premium home cinema and audio equipment, including AV receivers, surround sound speakers and portable devices. The word Onkyo translates as "sound resonance". On is from Chinese pronunciation, with traditional Japanese pronunciation as Oto, meaning "the sound". Kyo is also from Chinese pronunciation, pronounced as Hibiki (noun) or Hibiku (verb) in traditional Japanese, meaning "resound, sound, or echo". The company started under the name of Osaka Denki Onkyo K.K. in 1946 (a company not related to Nippon Denki Onkyo, which became Denon). The current Onkyo Corporation umbrella includes the Integra and Integra Research divisions as well as the main Onkyo brand.

History
In March 2015, Onkyo purchased Pioneer Corporation's Home Electronics Corporation, which produces home cinema amplifiers, Blu-ray players and other AV products. In return, Pioneer took a 14.95% stake in Onkyo. The Ohtsuki family remained the largest shareholders of the company with an approximately 26% stake, just above Gibson Brands, with a 16.5% stake.

With the bankruptcy of Gibson in 2018, Onkyo's shares held by Gibson were sold.

In May 2021, Voxx International and Sharp Corporation began negotiations with Onkyo to purchase its home audiovisual division. Voxx's subsidiary Premium Audio Company (PAC) entered a joint venture with Sharp to acquire the business, which includes the Onkyo and Integra brands, for $30.8 million and the assumption of certain debt plus payment of commissions to Onkyo in future. PAC would own 75% of the joint venture and Sharp 25%. PAC would manage all product development, engineering, sales, marketing, and distribution while Sharp would be responsible for manufacturing and supply chain management of Onkyo products. The acquisition was completed in September 2021.

Onkyo was delisted from the Tokyo Stock Exchange in August 2021 due to the market's rules on negative net worth.

On May 13, 2022, Onkyo announced that it was filing for bankruptcy. Onkyo, Integra, Pioneer and Pioneer Elite branded products continue to be distributed by PAC via its 11 Trading Company subsidiary. PAC and Sharp subsequently bought the remaining assets of Onkyo two months later.

Products

References

External links

Companies listed on the Tokyo Stock Exchange
Electronics companies established in 1946
Audio equipment manufacturers of Japan
Audio amplifier manufacturers
Compact Disc player manufacturers
Companies that have filed for bankruptcy in Japan
Headphones manufacturers
Manufacturing companies based in Osaka
Japanese companies established in 1946
Japanese brands
Sound cards
Electronics companies of Japan